Ecurie Rosier and Equipe Rosier were names used by French racing driver Louis Rosier to enter his own cars in Formula One between 1950 and his death in 1956. Commonly the vehicles were entered for Rosier himself, but he also provided cars for a number of other drivers during the period. Between 1950 and 1957 Ecurie Rosier collected a total fifteen World Championship points and one podium finish.

Formula One

Louis Rosier began entering cars in Formula One under his own name in 1950, first with a Talbot-Lago T26C with some success, recording two points-scoring finishes from his nine World Championship entries in 1950 and 1951. He also entered cars for Henri Louveau and Louis Chiron during these seasons.

In  Rosier started racing Ferraris, recording only one non-points scoring finish from his four World Championship entries.  was a better season for Rosier, finishing in the top ten five times from his seven entries, but failing to score any points.  was the best season for Ecurie Rosier, with fellow Frenchman Maurice Trintignant finishing fourth in Argentina and Robert Manzon finishing a strong third at the team's home Grand Prix.

For the 1954 Spanish Grand Prix Rosier entered the new Maserati 250F, and finished in seventh position. In  Rosier returned to entering only a single car for himself. He retired in Monaco and finished ninth in both Belgium and the Netherlands. For  Rosier again entered the Maserati. He started the season with a retirement at Monaco before finishing eighth in Belgium and sixth in France. After starting twenty-seventh in Britain, Rosier retired on lap twenty-three when his electrics failed. The 1956 German Grand Prix, where Rosier finished a strong fifth, proved to be the last Grand Prix of Ecurie Rosier because Louis Rosier died of injuries he sustained in a crash at the Montlhéry track, south of Paris, France, on 7 October 1956.

Complete Formula One results
(key) (results in bold indicate pole position; results in italics indicate fastest lap)

References

French auto racing teams
Formula One entrants
Auto racing teams established in 1950
Auto racing teams disestablished in 1956
24 Hours of Le Mans teams